The following is a list of current and former destinations served by Virgin Atlantic and its subsidiary Virgin Atlantic International .

Passenger

Cargo
In addition to the previously listed destinations served with scheduled passenger service, Virgin Atlantic has also operated scheduled, cargo-only flights on its passenger aircraft to the following destinations :

References

Lists of airline destinations
Virgin Atlantic